Nocardiopsis fildesensis  is a bacterium from the genus of Nocardiopsis which has been isolated from soil from the Chinese Antarctic Great Wall Station on the King George Island.

References

External links
Type strain of Nocardiopsis fildesensis at BacDive -  the Bacterial Diversity Metadatabase	

Actinomycetales
Bacteria described in 2014